Climacosphenia elegans is a species of marine pennate diatoms in the order Fragilariophyceae.

References

External links 

 
 Climacosphenia elegans at the World Register of marine Species (WoRMS)
 Climacosphenia elegans at algaebase

Species described in 1901

Fragilariophyceae